Tamara Meijer (born 5 July 1979) is a Dutch judoka. She competed in the women's extra-lightweight event at the 1996 Summer Olympics.

References

External links
 

1979 births
Living people
Dutch female judoka
Olympic judoka of the Netherlands
Judoka at the 1996 Summer Olympics
People from Zoetermeer
Sportspeople from South Holland
20th-century Dutch women